Aindrita Ray (born 3 March 1985) is an Indian actress, primarily appearing in Kannada films. She made her acting debut in 2007, starring in Meravanige and went on to appear in several commercially successful films, establishing herself as a leading contemporary actress of Kannada cinema. She is perhaps well known for her critically acclaimed performance as Devika, a mentally challenged girl, in Manasaare.

Early life and background
Aindrita Ray was born as the youngest daughter into a Bengali family in Udaipur, Rajasthan, where she spent her childhood, before moving to Mumbai. With her father, A. K. Ray, being a prosthodontist in the Indian Air Force, she along with her family moved from one place to another, finally settling in Bangalore.

Ray studied at Baldwin Girls High School, Bangalore. Later, she joined M. R. Ambedkar Dental College, Bangalore to pursue a bachelor's degree in dental science. While studying, she did part-time modelling, appearing in television advertisements, which paved way for her entry into the film industry. She started acting in Kannada movies, and once in a while appearing in Amateur/Short films.

Acting career

Debut and breakthrough (2008)

Aindrita Ray trained under fashion choreographer M. S. Sreedhar. She was also seen in a song in the 2006 Kannada movie  Jackpot, starring Harsha and Dhyaan.
Aindrita Ray began her acting career in the 2008 film Meravanige, playing Nandini, the love interest of the lead actor played by Prajwal Devaraj. The film received a moderate success at the box office, with Rediff.com lauding her performance and her dancing capabilities. Later, in the same year, she made a cameo appearance in Mast Majaa Madi, which had an ensemble cast.

Initial success and accolades (2009–10)
In 2009, Ray appeared in Vaayuputra, an action movie, alongside the debutant Chiranjeevi Sarja. This was followed by a brief appearance in the successful film, Love Guru, directed by Prashant Raj. However, she got her biggest break in the film Junglee and then Turning point movie was Manasaare for her critically acclaimed role of a mentally challenged girl. She received many awards and accolades for her role, which included Suvarna Award for Best Actress and a nomination for Filmfare Awards. This was followed by director Suri's Junglee, which found a moderate success.

In 2010, she starred in five films. Veera Parampare was the only successful movie among Nooru Janmaku, Nannavanu, Januma Janumadallu and a Bollywood parallel cinema, A Flat. She was nominated by Filmfare for the Best Actress category for Veera Parampare.

Recent works
After a series of flops, Ray was cast in the supporting role in the Puneeth Rajkumar starrer Paramathma. She was widely acclaimed by the critics for her obsessive character role. She was also noticed by the critics in Dhool. The other films, Manasina Maathu and Kaanchana, however were failures.

In 2012, she starred in Parijatha, opposite Diganth, which found moderate success. Her other films include Tony, with Srinagara Kitty in the lead and Rajani Kantha, with Duniya Vijay.

In 2014, she made her Bengali film debut with Bachchan, opposite Jeet and directed by Raja Chanda, which incidentally was a remake of the Kannada movie Vishnuvardhana.

In 2017, Ray appeared in Raja Chanda's Bengali film Amar Aponjon, alongside Soham Chakraborty, Priyanka Sarkar and Subhashree Ganguly.

In 2021, she is appearing in Hardik Gajjar's Hindi feature film Bhavai opposite Pratik Gandhi, releasing in theatres on 1 October.

Personal life
Aindrita married actor Diganth Manchale on 12 December 2018, after 10 years of courtship.

Filmography

Web series

Music Videos

Awards

References

External links

 
 
 

Actresses from Rajasthan
Indian film actresses
Living people
Actresses in Kannada cinema
Bengali people
Female models from Rajasthan
People from Udaipur
21st-century Indian actresses
Actresses in Hindi cinema
Actresses in Bengali cinema
Actresses in Telugu cinema
1985 births